Admiral Gaidis Andrejs Zeibots (born 26 June 1945 in Cirgaļu, Valka District) was Commander of the Joint Headquarters, head of the Latvian National Armed Forces from 2003 to 2006. He was elected on 30 January 2003 by the Latvian Parliament. Zeibots previously served as the Chief of staff of the Latvian Naval Forces. He graduated from the High Military Radio Electronics School in the Soviet Union in 1969.

References 

1945 births
Living people
Latvian admirals